The Atletica Riccardi (also known as Atletica Riccardi Milano) is an Italian athletics club based in Milan, founded in 1946.

Achievements
Atletica Riccardi won five editions of the men's Italian Championships in Athletics for clubs (2009, 2011, 2012, 2014, 2015).

Main athletes

Below is the list of the main athletes who have been in force in the Atletica Riccardi.
Olympic champions
Ivano Brugnetti
Gelindo Bordin

See also
Athletics in Italy

References

External links
 Atletica Riccardi at FIDAL 
 

Athletics clubs in Italy